Slovaks Forward (SN) is a political party in Serbia representing the Slovak national minority. Its leader is Pavel Surovi. The party is aligned with Aleksandar Vučić and the Serbian Progressive Party (Srpska napredna stranka, SNS).

Slovak National Council
Slovaks Forward won nine out of twenty-nine seats in Serbia's 2014 Slovak National Council election and eight seats in the 2018 election. Surovi was chosen as council vice-president after the 2018 election, although he was removed from this role in February 2021.

Vojvodina provincial politics
Slovaks Forward was registered as a political party in late 2015. It joined the Serbian Progressive Party's electoral alliance for the 2016 Vojvodina provincial election; Surovi was included on the Progressive Party's electoral list in the thirty-third position and was elected when the list won a majority victory with sixty-three out of 120 mandates. He was promoted to the fifteenth position on the Progressive list in the 2020 provincial election and was re-elected when the list won an increased majority with seventy-six mandates. As of 2021, Surovi is the sole representative of his party in the assembly. He sits in caucus with the Progressive Party's Aleksandar Vučić – For Our Children parliamentary group.

Surovi was confirmed for a new term as party leader in December 2019.

References

2015 establishments in Serbia
Slovak political parties in Serbia
Political parties established in 2015
Politics of Vojvodina